Teige Fitzpatrick, 4th Baron Upper Ossory (also known as Thady Fitzpatrick)(d. December 1627) was the son and heir of Florence Fitzpatrick, 3rd Baron Upper Ossory, by his wife Catherine O'More. He married Joan Butler, the daughter of Sir Edmund Butler of Cloughgrenan.

By her, he had issue:

Brian, aka Barnaby Fitzpatrick, 5th Baron Upper Ossory, his successor.
Dermot, aka Darby, who was twice married: firstly, Ellinor Comerford (daughter of Richard Comerford, Esq.), widow of John Kennedy, Esq.; and secondly, Ellen Shortall (daughter of Nicholas Shortall, Esq.). He and his son, Dermot Oge, were killed in a battle against English troops at Borris-in-Ossory in 1642.
Turlough, who married Onora Grace (daughter of Oliver Grace, Esq.).
John
Margaret, married to Thomas Hovenden of Tankardstown Castle, Queen's Co. 
Catherine, married to Callaghan Fitzgerald of Cloghkyle, Queen's Co.
Onora
Joan, married to William Butler, Esq., of Lynon, Co. Tipperary.

Teige Fitzpatrick died in December 1627 and rests at Aghamacart. His Lady Joan died in late 1631. Her will indicates a granddaughter named "Uny ny Donel" ("Una daughter of Donnell"), thereby indicating that Teige may have had another son, Donnell, who was omitted from the pedigree. Alternately, this could be a granddaughter through one of their daughters.

Notes

External links
The Fitzpatrick – Mac Giolla Phádraig Clan Society

Teige
1627 deaths
Barons in the Peerage of Ireland